Wendell Erdman Berry (born August 5, 1934) is an American novelist, poet, essayist, environmental activist, cultural critic, and farmer. Closely identified with rural Kentucky, Berry developed many of his agrarian themes in the early essays of The Gift of Good Land (1981) and The Unsettling of America (1977). His attention to the culture and economy of rural communities is also found in the novels and stories of Port William, such as A Place on Earth (1967), Jayber Crow (2000), and That Distant Land (2004).

He is an elected member of the Fellowship of Southern Writers, a recipient of The National Humanities Medal, and the Jefferson Lecturer for 2012. He is also a 2013 Fellow of The American Academy of Arts and Sciences and, since 2014, a member of the American Academy of Arts and Letters. Berry was named the recipient of the 2013 Richard C. Holbrooke Distinguished Achievement Award.  On January 28, 2015, he became the first living writer to be inducted into the Kentucky Writers Hall of Fame.

Life
Berry was the first of four children to be born to John Marshall Berry, a lawyer and tobacco farmer in Henry County, Kentucky, and Virginia Erdman Berry. The families of both parents had farmed in Henry County for at least five generations. Berry attended secondary school at Millersburg Military Institute and then earned a B.A. (1956) and M.A. (1957) in English at the University of Kentucky. In 1956, at the University of Kentucky he met another Kentucky writer-to-be, Gurney Norman. He completed his M.A. and married Tanya Amyx in 1957. In 1958, he attended Stanford University's creative writing program as a Wallace Stegner Fellow, studying under Stegner in a seminar that included Larry McMurtry, Robert Stone, Ernest Gaines, Tillie Olsen, and Ken Kesey. Berry's first novel, Nathan Coulter, was published in April 1960.

A John Simon Guggenheim Memorial Foundation Fellowship took Berry and his family to Italy and France in 1961, where he came to know Wallace Fowlie, critic and translator of French literature. From 1962 to 1964, he taught English at New York University's University Heights campus in the Bronx. In 1964, he began teaching creative writing at the University of Kentucky, from which he resigned in 1977. During this time in Lexington, Kentucky, he came to know author Guy Davenport, as well as author and monk Thomas Merton and photographer Ralph Eugene Meatyard.

They bought their first flock of seven Border Cheviot sheep in 1978. Lane's Landing is in Henry County, Kentucky in north central Kentucky near Port Royal, and his parents' birthplaces, and is on the western bank of the Kentucky River, not far from where it flows into the Ohio River. Berry has farmed, resided, and written at Lane's Landing ever since. He has written about his early experiences on the land and about his decision to return to it in essays such as "The Long-Legged House" and "A Native Hill".

From 1977 until 1980, he edited and wrote for Rodale, Inc. in Emmaus, Pennsylvania, including for its publications Organic Gardening and Farming and The New Farm. From 1987 to 1993, he returned to the English Department of the University of Kentucky. Berry has written at least twenty-five books (or chapbooks) of poems, sixteen volumes of essays, and twelve novels and short story collections. His writing is grounded in the notion that one's work ought to be rooted in and responsive to one's place.

Activism
Berry delivered "A Statement Against the War in Vietnam" during the Kentucky Conference on the War and the Draft on February 10, 1968, at the University of Kentucky in Lexington:

He debated former Secretary of Agriculture Earl Butz at Manchester University in Manchester, Indiana in November 1977. In this debate Berry defended the longstanding structure of small family farms and rural communities that were being replaced by what Butz saw as the achievements of industrial agriculture. “My basic assumption when talking about agriculture is that there’s more to it than just agriculture. That you can’t disconnect one part of a society from all the other parts and just look at the results and that alone.”

On June 3, 1979, Berry engaged in nonviolent civil disobedience against the construction of a nuclear power plant at Marble Hill, Indiana. He describes "this nearly eventless event" and expands upon his reasons for it in the essay "The Reactor and the Garden."

On February 9, 2003, Berry's essay titled "A Citizen's Response to the National Security Strategy of the United States" was published as a full-page advertisement in The New York Times. Berry opened the essay—a critique of the G. W. Bush administration's post-9/11 international strategy—by asserting that "The new National Security Strategy published by the White House in September 2002, if carried out, would amount to a radical revision of the political character of our nation."

On January 4, 2009, Berry and Wes Jackson, president of The Land Institute, published an op-ed article in The New York Times titled "A 50-Year Farm Bill." In July 2009 Berry, Jackson and Fred Kirschenmann, of The Leopold Center for Sustainable Agriculture, gathered in Washington DC to promote this idea. Berry and Jackson wrote, "We need a 50-year farm bill that addresses forthrightly the problems of soil loss and degradation, toxic pollution, fossil-fuel dependency and the destruction of rural communities."

Also in January 2009, Berry released a statement against the death penalty, which began, "As I am made deeply uncomfortable by the taking of a human life before birth, I am also made deeply uncomfortable by the taking of a human life after birth." And in November 2009, Berry and 38 other writers from Kentucky wrote to Gov. Steve Beshear and Attorney General Jack Conway asking them to impose a moratorium on the death penalty in that state.

On March 2, 2009, Berry joined over 2,000 others in non-violently blocking the gates to a coal-fired power plant in Washington, D.C. No one was arrested.

On May 22, 2009, Berry, at a listening session in Louisville, spoke against the National Animal Identification System (NAIS). He said, "If you impose this program on the small farmers, who are already overburdened, you're going to have to send the police for me. I'm 75 years old. I've about completed my responsibilities to my family. I'll lose very little in going to jail in opposition to your program – and I'll have to do it. Because I will be, in every way that I can conceive of, a non-cooperator."

In October 2009, Berry combined with "the Berea-based Kentucky Environmental Foundation (KEF), along with several other non-profit organizations and rural electric co-op members" to petition against and protest the construction of a coal-burning power plant in Clark County, Kentucky. On February 28, 2011, the Kentucky Public Service Commission approved the cancellation of this power plant.

On December 20, 2009, due to the University of Kentucky's close association with coal interests in the state, Berry removed his papers from the university. He explained to the Lexington Herald-Leader, "I don't think the University of Kentucky can be so ostentatiously friendly to the coal industry … and still be a friend to me and the interests for which I have stood for the last 45 years. … If they love the coal industry that much, I have to cancel my friendship." In August 2012, the papers were donated to The Kentucky Historical Society in Frankfort, KY.

On September 28, 2010, Berry participated in a rally in Louisville during an EPA hearing on how to manage coal ash. Berry said, "The EPA knows that coal ash is poison. We ask it only to believe in its own findings on this issue, and do its duty."

Berry, with 14 other protesters, spent the weekend of February 12, 2011 locked in the Kentucky governor's office to demand an end to mountaintop removal coal mining. He was part of the environmental group Kentuckians for the Commonwealth that began their sit-in on Friday and left at midday Monday to join about 1,000 others in a mass outdoor rally.

In 2011, The Berry Center was established at New Castle, Kentucky, "for the purpose of bringing focus, knowledge and cohesiveness to the work of changing our ruinous industrial agriculture system into a system and culture that uses nature as the standard, accepts no permanent damage to the ecosphere, and takes into consideration human health in local communities."

In July 2020, Wendell Berry and his wife Tanya Amyx Berry sued the University of Kentucky to prevent the removal of a mural that has been criticized for being "racially offensive." The mural was commissioned in the 1930s and was done by Ann Rice O'Hanlon, a relative of Tanya Amyx Berry.

In August 2022, at a public hearing of the Henry County, Kentucky planning commission, Wendell Berry spoke against re-zoning agricultural land to allow Angel's Envy distillery to develop the property "for bourbon-barrel storage and the development of an agritourism destination." Despite the testimony by Berry and others, the planning commission granted the re-zoning request.

Ideas
Berry's nonfiction serves as an extended conversation about the life he values. According to him, the good life includes sustainable agriculture, appropriate technologies, healthy rural communities, connection to place, the pleasures of good food, animal husbandry, good work, local economics, the miracle of life, fidelity, frugality, reverence, and the interconnectedness of life. The threats Berry finds to this good simple life include: industrial farming and the industrialization of life, ignorance, hubris, greed, violence against others and against the natural world, the eroding topsoil in the United States, global economics, and environmental destruction. As a prominent defender of agrarian values, Berry's appreciation for traditional farming techniques, such as those of the Amish, grew in the 1970s, due in part to exchanges with Draft Horse Journal publisher Maurice Telleen. Berry has long been friendly to and supportive of Wes Jackson, believing that Jackson's agricultural research at The Land Institute lives out the promise of "solving for pattern" and using "nature as model."

Jedediah Britton-Purdy has considered many of Berry's major themes and concerns:Over the years, he has called himself an agrarian, a pacifist, and a Christian—albeit of an eccentric kind. He has written against all forms of violence and destruction—of land, communities, and human beings—and argued that the modern American way of life is a skein of violence. He is an anti-capitalist moralist and a writer of praise for what he admires: the quiet, mostly uncelebrated labor and affection that keep the world whole and might still redeem it. He is also an acerbic critic of what he dislikes, particularly modern individualism, and his emphasis on family and marriage and his ambivalence toward abortion mark him as an outsider to the left.The concept of "Solving for pattern", coined by Berry in his essay of the same title, is the process of finding solutions that solve multiple problems, while minimizing the creation of new problems. The essay was originally published in the Rodale, Inc. periodical The New Farm. Though Mr. Berry's use of the phrase was in direct reference to agriculture, it has since come to enjoy broader use throughout the design community.

Berry, who describes himself as "a person who takes the Gospel seriously," has criticized Christian organizations for failing to challenge cultural complacency about environmental degradation, and has shown a willingness to criticize what he perceives as the arrogance of some Christians. He is an advocate of Christian pacifism, as shown in his book Blessed Are the Peacemakers: Christ's Teachings About Love, Compassion and Forgiveness (2005).

Berry's core ideas, and in particular his poem "Sabbaths III, 1989 (Santa Clara Valley)," guided the 2007 documentary feature film The Unforeseen, produced by Terrence Malick and Robert Redford. In the film Berry narrates his own poem. Director Laura Dunn went on to make the 2016 documentary feature Look & See: A Portrait of Wendell Berry, again produced by Malick and Redford.

Poetry

Berry's lyric poetry often appears as a contemporary eclogue, pastoral, or elegy; but he also composes dramatic and historical narratives (such as "Bringer of Water" and "July, 1773", respectively) and occasional and discursive poems ("Against the War in Vietnam" and "Some Further Words", respectively).

Berry's first published poetry book consisted of a single poem, the elegiac November Twenty Six Nineteen Hundred Sixty Three (1964), initiated and illustrated by Ben Shahn, commemorating the death of John F. Kennedy. It begins,

We know
The winter earth
Upon the body
Of the young
   President,
   And the early dark
   Falling;

and continues through ten more stanzas (each propelled by the anaphora of "We know"). The elegiac here and elsewhere, according to Triggs, enables Berry to characterize the connections "that link past and future generations through their common working of the land."

The first full-length collection, The Broken Ground (1964), develops many of Berry's fundamental concerns: "the cycle of life and death, responsiveness to place, pastoral subject matter, and recurring images of the Kentucky River and the hill farms of north-central Kentucky."

According to Angyal, "There is little modernist formalism or postmodernist experimentation in [Berry's] verse." A commitment to the reality and primacy of the actual world stands behind these two rejections. In "Notes: Unspecializing Poetry," Berry writes, "Devotion to order that is not poetical prevents the specialization of poetry."  He goes on to note, "Nothing exists for its own sake, but for a harmony greater than itself which includes it. A work of art, which accepts this condition, and exists upon its terms, honors the Creation, and so becomes a part of it."

Lionel Basney placed Berry's poetry within a tradition of didactic poetry that stretches back to Horace: "To say that Berry's poetry can be didactic, then, means that it envisions a specific wisdom, and also the traditional sense of art and culture that gives art the task of teaching this wisdom."

For Berry, poetry exists "at the center of a complex reminding"  Both the poet and the reader are reminded of the poem's crafted language, of the poem's formal literary antecedents, of  "what is remembered or ought to be remembered," and of "the formal integrity of other works, creatures and structures of the world."

The Sabbath Poems 
From 1979 to the present Berry has been writing what he calls "Sabbath poems." They were first collected in A Timbered Choir: The Sabbath Poems 1979-1997. This was followed by Sabbaths from 1998 to 2004 in Given: New Poems; and those from 2005 to 2008 are in Leavings. All Sabbath poems through 2012 are published in This Day: New and Collected Sabbath Poems 1979 - 2012. Sabbaths 2013 has been published by Larkspur Press. A Small Porch contains nine Sabbath poems from 2014 and sixteen from 2015. One Sabbath poem, "What Passes, What Remains" (VIII from 2016), is published as the epilogue in The Art of Loading Brush. That poem, along with fourteen others, can also be found in Sabbaths 2016, published by Larkspur Press.

The poems are motivated by Berry's longtime habit of walking out onto the land on Sunday mornings. As he puts it, "I go free from the tasks and intentions of my workdays, and so my mind becomes hospitable to unintended thoughts: to what I am very willing to call inspiration." He writes in a poem from 1979,
The bell calls in the town 
Where forebears cleared the shaded land
And brought high daylight down
To shine on field and trodden road.
I hear, but understand
Contrarily, and walk into the woods.
I leave labor and load,
Take up a different story.
I keep an inventory
Of wonders and of uncommercial goods.The Sabbath poems have been described as "written from a particular place and on particular Sabbaths, and so should be read as part of a spiritual practice and as poems, in some sense, devoted to dwelling, to living thoughtfully in one place."  Oehlschlaeger links Berry's project to a key observation by Henry David Thoreau,

As Thoreau continues in 'Life Without Principle,' he notes the constant busyness of Americans, so engaged in 'infinite bustle' that 'there is no sabbath.' And he notes later that 'there is nothing, not even crime, more opposed to poetry, to philosophy, ay, to life itself, than this incessant business.' The logic is clear: destruction of the Sabbath is contrary to 'life itself.' That, I suggest, is the context in which we should read the Sabbath poems that Berry has been writing for nearly the last thirty years.

Fiction

Berry's fiction to date consists of eight novels and fifty-seven short stories—all of which are collected in That Distant Land (2004), A Place in Time (2012) and How It Went (2022)—and one verse drama which, when read as a whole, form a chronicle of the fictional small Kentucky town of Port William. Because of his long-term, ongoing exploration of the life of an imagined place, Berry has been compared to William Faulkner. Yet, although Port William is no stranger to murder, suicide, alcoholism, marital discord, and the full range of losses that touch human lives, it lacks the extremes of characterization and plot development that are found in much of Faulkner. Hence Berry is sometimes described as working in an idealized, pastoral, or nostalgic mode, a characterization of his work which he resists: "If your work includes a criticism of history, which mine certainly does, you can't be accused of wanting to go back to something, because you're saying that what we were wasn't good enough."

The effect of profound shifts in the agricultural practices of the United States, and the disappearance of traditional agrarian life, are some of the major concerns of the Port William fiction, though the theme is often only a background or subtext to the stories themselves. The Port William fiction attempts to portray, on a local scale, what "a human economy … conducted with reverence"  looked like in the past—and what civic, domestic, and personal virtues might be evoked by such an economy were it pursued today. Social as well as seasonal changes mark the passage of time. The Port William stories allow Berry to explore the human dimensions of the decline of the family farm and farm community, under the influence of expanding post-World War II agribusiness. But these works rarely fall into simple didacticism, and are never merely tales of decline. Each is grounded in a realistic depiction of character and community. In A Place on Earth (1967), for example, farmer Mat Feltner comes to terms with the loss of his only son, Virgil. In the course of the novel, we see how not only Mat but the entire community wrestles with the acute costs of World War II.

Berry's fiction also allows him to explore the literal and metaphorical implications of marriage as that which binds individuals, families, and communities to each other and to Nature itself—yet not all of Port William is happily or conventionally married. "Old Jack" Beechum struggles with significant incompatibilities with his wife, and with a brief yet fulfilling extramarital affair. The barber Jayber Crow lives with a forlorn, secret, and unrequited love for a woman, believing himself "mentally" married to her even though she knows nothing about it. Burley Coulter never formalizes his bond with Kate Helen Branch, the mother of his son. Yet, each of these men find themselves firmly bound up in the community, the "membership," of Port William.

Of his fictional project, Berry has written: "I have made the imagined town of Port William, its neighborhood and membership, in an attempt to honor the actual place where I have lived. By means of the imagined place, over the last fifty years, I have learned to see my native landscape and neighborhood as a place unique in the world, a work of God, possessed of an inherent sanctity that mocks any human valuation that can be put upon it." Elsewhere, Berry has said, "The only thing I try to accomplish in fiction is to show how people act when they love each other."
The novels and stories can be read in any order.

In January, 2018, the Library of America published a volume of Berry's fiction—the first of a projected four volumes of his writing. Wendell Berry: Port William Novels & Stories (The Civil War to World War II) contains four novels and twenty-three short stories in chronological order according to the stories' events. Berry is one of very few living writers currently featured in the Library of America catalog.

Nathan Coulter (1960)
In Berry's first novel, young Nathan "comes of age" through dealing with the death of his mother, the depression of his father, Jarrat, the rugged companionship of his brother Tom, and the mischief of his uncle Burley. Kirkus Review concludes, "A sensitive adolescent theme is handled rather poetically, but so uniform in tone that no drama is generated and no sense of time passing is felt." John Ditsky finds William Faulkner's influence in Nathan Coulter, but notes, "Not only does the work avoid the pitfalls encountered by Faulkner's initial attempts to escape his postage stamp of native soil, but Nathan Coulter also seems a wise attempt to get that autobiographical first novel out of one's system, and to do so [with] honesty."

A Place on Earth (1967/1983)
Set in the critical year of 1945, this novel focuses on farmer Mat Feltner's struggle over the news that his son Virgil has been listed as missing in action while also telling multiple tales of the lives of other Port William residents, such as Burley Coulter, Jack Beechum, Ernest Finley, Ida and Gideon Crop. Reprinting by North Point Press in 1983 allowed Berry to radically revise the novel, removing almost a third of its original length. Jeffrey Bilbro believes that these substantial changes marked growth in Berry's approach. "In Berry's revised edition, his technique caught up with his subject. He allows us, as readers, to participate in the ignorance of his characters, and in doing so, we may be able to understand more fully the painful difficulty of choosing fidelity to the natural order while living in the midst of mystery."

The Memory of Old Jack  (1974)
This third novel of Port William begins with Jack Beechum as a very old man in 1952 and continues back into his youth and maturity to uncover his life and work as a dedicated farmer, conflicted husband, and living link to past generations. The story ranges from the Civil War to just past World War II. Josh Hurst comments on Berry's ability to avoid certain narrative pitfalls, "Jack's story could be presented us either as heroic ballad or as cautionary [tale]—and there is much in his life to support both admiration and gentle tisk-tisking—but the gift of this book is how it allows a man's memories to wash over us as though unshaped by narrative or conscious editorializing."

Remembering (1988)
In Berry's fourth novel, an adult Andy Catlett wanders through San Francisco remembering, but feeling alienated from, his native Port William. He struggles to come to terms with himself, his marriage, his farm, and the distorted values of American society. Of Berry's vision here, Charles Solomon writes, "Wendell Berry contrasts modern American agribusiness--which he depicts as an artificial conglomeration of sterile flow charts, debts and mechanization--with the older ideal of farming as a nurturing way of life." But along these lines, Bruce Bawer finds a problem with the novel, "Here, for the first time in a Port William novel, Berry seems more interested in communicating opinions than in portraying sympathetic characters in plausible situations; the opening episode, set at a conference on agricultural policy, paints the ideological conflict between Andy and his adversaries in broad, unsubtle strokes."

A World Lost (1996)
Young Andy Catlett's uncle Andrew had been murdered back in 1944, and now an adult Andy is reconstructing the event and its aftermath. "Looking back with a mixture of a young boy's incomprehension and an older man's nostalgia, Andy evokes the past not as a narrative but as a series of disembodied fragments in the flow of time." In this fifth novel of Port William, Berry considers the violence of men and its impact on the family and community that must come to terms with it. "Berry shows us the psychic costs of misplaced family pride and social rigidity, and yet he also celebrates the benevolent blessing of familial love. This is simple, soul-satisfying storytelling, augmented by understated humor and quiet insight."

Jayber Crow (2000)
Port William's barber recounts his life's journey in Berry's sixth novel. Jayber's early life as an orphan near Port William is followed by studies towards a possible vocation to Church ministry. A questioning mind, however, sends him in other directions until he finds himself back in Port William with an ever-growing commitment to that place and its people. As Publishers Weekly notes, "Crow's life, which begins as WWI is about to erupt, is emblematic of a century of upheaval, and Berry's anecdotal and episodic tale sounds a challenge to contemporary notions of progress. It is to Berry's credit that a novel so freighted with ideas and ideology manages to project such warmth and luminosity."

Hannah Coulter (2004)
Berry's seventh novel presents a concise vision of Port William's "membership." The story encompasses Hannah's life, including the Great Depression, World War II, the postwar industrialization of agriculture, the flight of youth to urban employment, and the consequent remoteness of grandchildren. The tale is told in the voice of an old woman twice widowed, who has experienced much loss yet has never been defeated. Somehow, lying at the center of her strength is the "membership"—the fact that people care for each other and, even in absence, hold each other in a kind of presence. All in all, Hannah Coulter embodies many of the themes of Berry's Port William saga.

Andy Catlett: Early Travels (2006)
Andy Catlett, age nine, makes his first solo journey to visit with both sets of grandparents in Port William. The New York Times reviewer notes, "What the grown-up Andy recalls of that experience is transformed into 'a sort of homage' to a now-vanished world. Title characters from Berry's earlier Port William volumes — Jayber Crow, Old Jack, Hannah Coulter — appear here in affectionate cameos as the adult Andy, echoing Wordsworth, observes that 'in my memory, all who were there ... seem now to be gathered into a love that is at once a boy's and an aging man's.'"

Awards

Works

Fiction

Uncollected short stories
"Nothing Living Lives Alone". The Threepenny Review. Spring 2011. PEN/O. Henry Prize Story, 2012  (The third section of this story has been published as "Time Out of Time (1947-2015)" in the 2022 collection How It Went.)

Nonfiction

Uncollected essays
 "KCADP's YouTube Channel." April 24, 2009.
 
"To Break The Silence" Appalachian Heritage Vol 41 (3), Summer 2013, pp 78–84.

Poetry

Interviews
Weinreb, Mindy. "A Question a Day: A Written Conversation with Wendell Berry"  in Merchant, 1991
Beattie, L. Elisabeth (Editor). "Wendell Berry" in Conversations With Kentucky Writers,  University Press of Kentucky, 1996.
Minick, Jim. "A Citizen and a Native: An Interview with Wendell Berry" Appalachian Journal, Vol. 31, Nos 3–4, (Spring-Summer, 2004)
Berger, Rose Marie. "Wendell Berry interview complete text," Sojourner's Magazine, July 2004 
Brockman, Holly. "How can a family 'live at the center of its own attention?' Wendell Berry's thoughts on the good life", January/February 2006 
Grubbs, Morris Allen (Editor). Conversations with Wendell Berry, University Press of Mississippi, 2007. 
Hooks, Bell. "Healing Talk: A Conversation" in "Belonging: A Culture of Place", 2009, Routledge.
Smith, Peter. "Wendell Berry's still unsettled in his ways." The Courier-Journal, September 30, 2007, A1.
"Wendell Berry: A conversation," The Diane Rehm Show. WAMU 88.5 American University Radio, November 30, 2009.
Leonard, Sarah. "Nature as an Ally" Dissent, Vol. 59, No. 2, Spring, 2012
"Wendell Berry: Poet & Prophet," Moyers & Company. PBS. October 4, 2013.
Lehrer, Brian. The Brian Lehrer Show WYNC, October 17, 2013 
"Distant Neighbors: Wendell Berry & Gary Snyder",  part of 2014 Festival of Faiths: Sacred Earth / Sacred Self 
"Wendell Berry, Burkean" Interview with Gracy Olmstead. The American Conservative, February 17, 2015.
"Going Home with Wendell Berry." Petrusich, Amanda. The New Yorker. July 2019.
Fisher-Smith, Jordan. "Field Observations: An Interview with Wendell Berry'" 
DeChristopher, Tim. "To Live and Love with a Dying World: A conversation between Tim DeCristopher and Wendell Berry". Orion, Spring 2020.
"2022 Kentucky Book Festival: Crystal Wilkinson in conversation with Wendell Berry."

Forewords, introductions, prefaces, and afterwords

Musical Settings and Responses

See also

Agrarianism
Fellowship of Southern Writers
Front Porch Republic
The Land Institute
John Seymour (author)
Local food
Localism (politics)
Southern Agrarians
Sustainability
Subsidiarity
Wallace Stegner
Wes Jackson

References

Further reading
Baker, Jack and Jeffrey Bilbro, ed. Telling the Stories Right: Wendell Berry's Imagination of Port William. Eugene, OR: Front Porch Republic Books, 2018.
Baker, Jack and Jeffrey Bilbro. Wendell Berry and Higher Education: Cultivating Virtues of Place. Lexington: University Press of Kentucky, 2017.
Bilbro, Jeffrey. Virtues of Renewal: Wendell Berry's Sustainable Forms. Lexington, University Press of Kentucky, 2019.
Bilbro, Jeffrey. "The Way of Love: Berry's Vision of Work in the Kingdom of God," in Loving God's Wildness: The Christian Roots of Ecological Ethics in American Literature. Tuscaloosa: University of Alabama Press, 2015. 138-178.
Bonzo, J. Matthew and Michael R. Stevens. Wendell Berry and the Cultivation of Life: A Reader's Guide. Grand Rapids: Brazos, 2008.
Goodrich, Janet. The Unforeseen Self in the Works of Wendell Berry. Columbia: University of Missouri Press, 2001.
Heinzelman, Kurt (1980), Indigenous Art: The Poetry of Wendell Berry, in Bold, Christine, (ed.), Cencrastus No. 2, Spring 1980, pp. 34 – 37, 
Merchant, Paul, ed. Wendell Berry (American Authors Series). Lewiston, Idaho: Confluence, 1991.
Mitchell, Mark and Nathan Schlueter. The Humane Vision of Wendell Berry. Wilmington, DE: ISI Books, 2011.
Oehlschlaeger, Fritz. The Achievement of Wendell Berry: The Hard History of Love. Lexington: University Press of Kentucky, 2011.
Peters, Jason, ed. Wendell Berry: Life and Work. Lexington: University Press of Kentucky, 2007.
Shuman, Joel James and Owens, L. Roger (eds). Wendell Berry and Religion: Heaven's Earthly Life. Lexington: University Press of Kentucky, 2009.
Smith, Kimberly K. Wendell Berry and the Agrarian Tradition: A Common Grace. Lawrence: University Press of Kansas, 2003.
Sutterfield, Ragan. Wendell Berry and the Given Life. Cincinnati, OH: Franciscan Media, 2017.
Wiebe, Joseph R. The Place of Imagination: Wendell Berry and the Poetics of Community, Affection, and Identity. Waco, TX: Baylor University Press, 2017

External links

The Wendell Berry Catalogue from Counterpoint Press
Internet Resources
The Membership: A Wendell Berry Podcast
The Berry Center

1934 births
20th-century American novelists
20th-century American poets
21st-century American essayists
21st-century American novelists
21st-century American poets
American agrarianists
American agricultural writers
American anti-globalization writers
American Christian pacifists
American environmentalists
American male essayists
American male novelists
American male poets
American male short story writers
American short story writers
Baptists from Kentucky
Farmers from Kentucky
Fellows of the American Academy of Arts and Sciences
Living people
National Humanities Medal recipients
Neo-Luddites
New York University faculty
Novelists from Kentucky
People from Henry County, Kentucky
Poets from Kentucky
Rockefeller Fellows
Rural community development
Simple living advocates
Stegner Fellows
University of Kentucky alumni
University of Kentucky faculty
Writers of American Southern literature
20th-century American male writers
21st-century American male writers
Members of the American Academy of Arts and Letters